The Twelve Collegia, or Twelve Colleges, is the largest edifice from the Petrine era remaining in Saint Petersburg. It was designed by Domenico Trezzini and Theodor Schwertfeger and built from 1722 to 1744.

Description 
The three story, red-brick complex of 12 buildings is 400–440 meters long, giving an illusion of one enormous edifice. The result is an "austerely structured" complex with a "rustic style". The original design separated the 12 individual buildings. In subsequent restructuring, they were connected to form the modern complex.

History 

The Twelve Collegia was commissioned by Peter the Great, who wanted a place for the Russian government, at the time divided into 12 branches: 
 The Senate (created in February 1711, eventually renamed "Council of the Empire")
 The Synod
 Nine colleges, which replaced the old prikazy system (subsequently replaced by Ministries in 1802 under the rule of Alexander I): Foreign Affairs, Revenue Collection, Justice, Expenditure, Financial Control, War, Admiralty, Commerce, Mining and Manufacturing
 Additional, or tenth college/ministry for trade

Modern use 

Twelve Collegia presently serves as one of three Petrine Baroque structures for Saint Petersburg State University. The Twelve Collegia are the headquarters of the university, which was founded in 1819 (it claims to be the successor of the Academy of St. Petersburg, and dates its foundation to 1724), stands along Mendeleevskaya Line on Vasilievsky Island.

Footnotes

External links 

Buildings and structures in Saint Petersburg
Government buildings completed in 1744
Office buildings completed in 1744
Baroque architecture in Saint Petersburg
Domenico Trezzini buildings and structures
1744 establishments in the Russian Empire
Cultural heritage monuments of federal significance in Saint Petersburg